English in Southern England (also, rarely, Southern English English; Southern England English; or in the UK, simply, Southern English) is the collective set of different dialects and accents of Modern English spoken in Southern England. 

As of the 21st century, a wide class of dialects labelled "Estuary English" is on the rise in South East England and the Home Counties (the counties bordering London), which was the traditional interface between the London urban region and more local and rural accents. 

Commentators report widespread homogenisation in South East England in the 20th century (Kerswill & Williams 2000; Britain 2002). This involved a process of levelling between the extremes of working-class Cockney in inner-city London and the careful upper-class standard accent of Southern England, Received Pronunciation (RP), popular in the 20th century with upper-middle and upper-class residents. Now spread throughout the South East region, Estuary English is the resulting mainstream accent that combines features of both Cockney and a more middle-class RP. Less affluent areas have variants of Estuary English that grade into southern rural England outside urban areas.

Outside of South East England, West Country English (of South West England) and East Anglian English survive as traditional broad dialects in Southern England today, though they too are subject to Estuary English influence in recent decades and are consequently weakening.

London and Estuary English

London and greater Thames Estuary accents are non-rhotic: that is, the consonant  (phonetically ) occurs only before vowels.

General characteristics of all major London accents include:
But the diphthong is retained before inflectional endings, so that board and pause often contrast with bored  and paws .
See bad–lad split.
 an allophone of  before "dark L" , namely , for example whole  versus holy .

Features of working- or middle-class Estuary English, spoken in the counties all around London in the 21st century, include:
 Not as much h-dropping as Cockney, but still more than RP
 Increased amount of th-fronting, like Cockney
 fronting to 
  can take the more RP variant of 
  can have an onset lower than RP but higher than Cockney: 
  fronted to 
  fronted
  lowers and backs, different from both RP and Cockney

Cockney

Cockney is the traditional accent of the working classes of the areas immediately surrounding the City of London itself (most famously including the East End). It is characterised by many phonological differences from RP:
 The dental fricatives  are replaced with labiodental , for example think 
 H-dropping, for example house 

Multicultural London English

Multicultural London English (abbreviated MLE), colloquially called Blockney or Jafaican, is a dialect (and/or sociolect) of English that emerged in the late 20th century. It is spoken mainly by youths in multicultural parts of working-class London.

The speech of Jamaicans, or children of Jamaican parents, in London shows interesting combinations of the Jamaican accent with the London accent. Hypercorrections like  for foot are also heard from Jamaicans. John C. Wells's dissertation, Jamaican pronunciation in London, was published by the Philological Society in 1973.

Berkshire and Hampshire English
Berkshire and Hampshire are on the modern-day border between Estuary English and West Country English. Berkshire is predominantly non-rhotic today, but traditional accents may still be found across the county. Parts of West Berkshire may still be rhotic or variably rhotic, though this feature is quickly becoming even less frequent. In country areas and Southampton, the older rhotic accent can still be heard amongst some speakers, for example by John Arlott, Lord Denning and Reg Presley. Since the 1960s, particularly in Andover and Basingstoke, the local accent has changed reflecting the arrival of East Londoners relocated by London County Council. It can be argued that Hampshire is a borderline county moving East, linguistically.

"Estuary-isms" can be found in Portsmouth or "Pompey" English, some of which may actually originate from Portsmouth rather than London.

West Country English

South West England or "West Country" English is a family of similar strongly rhotic accents, now perceived as rural. It originally extended an even larger region, across much of South East England, including an area south of the "broad A" isogloss, but the modern West Country dialects are now most often classified west of a line roughly from Shropshire via Oxfordshire. Their shared characteristics have been caricatured as Mummerset.

They persist most strongly in areas that remain largely rural with a largely indigenous population, particularly the West Country. In many other areas they are declining because of RP and Estuary accents moving to the area; for instance, strong Isle of Wight accents tend to be more prevalent in older speakers.

As well as rhoticity, here are common features of West County accents:
 The vowel  (as in lot) realised as an unrounded vowel , as in many forms of American English.
 In the Bristol area a vowel at the end of a word is often followed by an intrusive dark l, . Hence the old joke about the three Bristolian sisters Evil, Idle, and Normal (written Eva, Ida, and Norma). L is pronounced darkly where it is present, too, which means that in Bristolian rendering, 'idea' and 'ideal' are homophones.
 H-dropping in South Devon and Cornwall, "Berry 'Aid" for Berry Head (in Brixham, South Devon)

In traditional Southern rural accents, the voiceless fricatives  always remain voiceless, which is the main difference from West Country accents.

East Anglian English

Features which can be found in East Anglian English (especially in Norfolk) include:
 The vowel  (as in lot) realised as an unrounded vowel , as in many forms of American English.
 Merger of the vowels of near and square (RP  and ), making chair and cheer homophones.
 East Anglian accents are generally non-rhotic.

There are differences between and even within areas of East Anglia: the Norwich accent has distinguishing aspects from the Norfolk dialect that surrounds itchiefly in the vowel sounds. The accents of Suffolk and Cambridgeshire are different from the Norfolk accent.

19th-century Essex, Kent, Sussex, and Surrey English
The region largely south of London, including Surrey, Sussex, and once even Kent, used to speak with what today would be lumped under a South West England or "West Country" dialect. In all these counties plus Essex, front , front , and high  vowels predominated in the 19th century.

Modern Essex, Kent, and Sussex English is usually associated with non-rhotic Estuary English, mainly in urban areas receiving an influx of East London migrants since World War II. However, rhoticity used to characterize the traditional rural accents in Kent, Surrey, and Sussex, though it has long been a recessive feature. Still, it is possible that some Sussex and Kentish rhoticity lasted until as recently as the early 21st century in certain pockets.

The vowel  (as in ) is very occasionally used for the  vowel, normally ; it has been reported as a minority variant in Kent and Essex.

In the 18th and 19th centuries, in Essex, Kent, and east Sussex, plus several other South East areas including London, Suffolk, and Norfolk,
In the 19th century, across all of Southern England, arter without an f (non-rhotically) was a common pronunciation of after.

The pattern of speech in some of Charles Dickens' books pertain to Kentish dialect, as the author lived at Higham, was familiar with the mudflats near Rochester and created a comic character Sam Weller who spoke the local accent, principally Kentish but with strong London influences.

Modern Estuary dialect features were also reported in some traditional varieties, including L-vocalization e.g. old as owd, as well as yod-coalescence in Kent.

Essex
The East Anglian feature of yod-dropping was common in Essex. In addition, Mersea Island (though not the rest of Essex) showed some rhoticity in speakers born as late as the early 20th century, a feature that characterised other rural dialects of South East England in the 19th century. Th-fronting, a feature now widespread in England, was found throughout Essex in the 1950s Survey of English Dialects, which studied speakers born in the late 1800s. Many words are unique to 19th-century Essex dialect, some examples including bonx meaning "to beat up batter for pudding" and hodmedod or hodmadod meaning "snail". Several nonstandard grammatical features exist, such as irregular plural forms like housen for "houses".

Surrey
A unique  dialect existed as recently as the late 19th century in the historic county of Surrey, in western Kent, and in parts of northern Sussex, though it has now almost entirely died out. It was first documented by Granville W. G. Leveson Gower (1838–1895), of Titsey Place, during the 1870s and first published by him in A Glossary of Surrey Words in 1893. 

Gower was first made aware of the dialect after reading a letter in a local newspaper. Following that, and after his own enquiries, he expressed a fear that improved transport and the spread of education would cause such local dialects to disappear and be forgotten despite the fact that, in his words, "Old customs, old beliefs, old prejudices die hard in the soil of England". Gower described certain standard English words with nonstandard pronunciations in the Surrey dialect:

Gowers mentions: 
Acrost for across; agoo for ago; batcheldor for bachelor; brownchitis (or sometime brown titus) for bronchitis; chimley or chimbley for chimney; crowner for coroner; crowner's quest for coroner's inquest; curosity and curous for curiosity and curious ; death for deaf; disgest for digest, and indisgestion for indigestion; gownd for gown; scholard for scholar; nevvy for nephew; non-plush'd for non-plussed; refuge for refuse; quid for cud, " chewing the quid; "sarment for sermon; varmint for vermin; sloop for slope; spartacles for spectacles; spavin for spasms. I knew an old woman who was constantly suffering from "the windy spavin;" taters for potatoes; wunstfor once; wuts for oats, etc., etc."
Syntax of the Surrey dialect included:
 The Old and Middle English prefix of "a-" is used generally before substantives, before participles and with adjectives placed after nouns, e.g., a-coming, a-going, a-plenty, a-many.
 Double negatives in a sentence are common, "You don't know nothing", "The gent ain't going to give us nothing"
 "be" is common for "are", e.g., "How be you?" is noted, to which "I be pretty middlin', thank ye" was the usual answer.
 Superlatives (+est) were used in place of the word "most", e.g., "the impudentest man I ever see"
 "You've no ought" was the equivalent of "you should not"
 "See" was used for saw (the preterite usually past simple) of see
 "Grow'd," "know'd," "see'd," "throw'd," and similar were however also used both for the perfect and participle passive of the verbs, e.g., "I've know'd a litter of seven whelps reared in that hole"
 Past participle takes more complex forms after common consonants "-ded," "-ted," e.g., attackted, drownded, "Such a country as this, where everything is either scorched up with the sun or drownded with the rain."
 The pleonastic use of "-like" denoting "vaguely", e.g. comfortable-like, timid-like, dazed-like, "I have felt lonesome-like ever since."
 "all along of" meaning "because of"
 

Phonological features included long-standing yod-coalescence, now typical of dialects throughout England, as well as the increasingly disappearing feature of rhoticity.

 bait – an afternoon meal about 4 pm
 bannick – a verb meaning to beat or thrash
 baulky – is said of a person who tries to avoid you
 beazled – tired
 beatle – a mallet
 befront – in front of
 beleft – the participle of "believe"
 bettermost – upper-class people
 bly – a likeness, "he has a bly of his father"
 burden – a quantity
 comb – the moss that grows on church bells
 clung – moist or damp grass
 dryth – drought
 fail – a verb meaning to fall ill
 fly-golding – a ladybird
 foundrous – boggy or marshy
 gratten – stubble left in a field after harvest
 hem – a lot or much
 hot – a verb meaning to heat something up, "hot it over the fire"
 innardly – to talk innardly is to mumble
 leastways – otherwise
 lief – rather, "I'd lief not"
 lippy – rude
 market fresh – drunk
 messengers – small clouds (also called "water dogs")
 middlin – reasonable or average
 mixen – a heap of dung or soil
 mothery – mouldy
 notation – making a fuss
 nurt – a verb meaning to entice
 ornary – being unwell (the word means "ordinary")
 peart – brisk or lively
 picksome – pretty or dainty
 platty – uneven
 quirk – a faint noise indicating fear
 runagate – good for nothing
 sauce – vegetables, e.g. "green sauce", pronounced "soss"
 scrow – a verb to scowl
 shatter – sprinkling
 shifty – untidy
 shuckish – unsettled, showery weather
 snob – shoemaker
 spoon meat – soup
 statesman – landowner
 stood – stuck
 swimy – giddy
 the smoke – London
 tidy – adjective meaning good or well
 timmersome – timid
 uppards – towards London or in the north
 venturesome – brave
 welt – scorched
 wift – quic

Sussex
In addition to the above features, namely rhoticity, the traditional Sussex accent showed certain other features, like an extremely narrow  vowel and th-stopping. Reduplicated plural forms were a grammatical feature of the Sussex dialect, such as ghostses in place of the standard English ghosts. Many old Sussex words once existed, thought to have derived from Sussex's fishermen and their links with fishermen from the coasts of France and the Netherlands. A universal feminine gender pronoun was typical, reflected in a joking saying in Sussex that 'Everything in Sussex is a she except a tomcat and she's a he.'

See also

 South African English
 Australian English
 Zimbabwean English
 New Zealand English
 Falkland Islands English
 Regional accents of English

References

External links
 English (Southern England) DoReCo corpus compiled by Nils Norman Schiborr. Audio recordings of narrative texts with transcriptions time-aligned at the phone level, translations, and time-aligned morphological annotations.

English language in England
.